“The Syrian Express” is a conventional term used to describe the regular supply voyages of Russian naval landing ships to Syria that began in the second decade of the 21st century.

References

External Links
 Russia Launches Syrian Express Operation as Turkey Attacks in Idlib. Warsaw Institute, 3 March 2020

Russia–Syria relations
Russian Navy